Emerik Josipović (1 September 1834 – 30 May 1910) was a Croatian politician of the Unionist Party, who served as Minister without portfolio of Croatian Affairs between 1889 and 1898. His father was Antun Josipović, who fought besides the Hungarians during the Hungarian Revolution of 1848, for which he was imprisoned and his property was confiscated. After regaining this property, Emerik was primarily occupied with repairs of it until the 1870s. As representative of Varaždin County, he was member of the Diet of Croatia – the Sabor – but when Koloman Bedeković died, he became also member of the Diet of Hungary – the Országgyűlés.

Josipović was appointed Minister of Croatian Affairs in 1889. He resigned from his position on 10 December 1898. In 1892, he received  inner privy councillor rank. In 1906 he became a member of the House of Magnates (the Hungarian assembly's upper house). His son, Gejza Josipović, also served as Minister of Croatian Affairs.

References
 Magyar Életrajzi Lexikon

Croatian politicians
1834 births
1910 deaths
Ministers of Croatian Affairs of Hungary